This is a bibliography of books critical of Scientology and the Church of Scientology, sorted by alphabetical order of titles.

Overview 

Between 1954 and 2020, only four English-language scholarly monographs have been published about Scientology (Wallis 1977 [1976]; Whitehead 1987; Urban 2011; Westbrook 2019). Most other critical works have come in the form of apostate memoirs: books written by ex-members about their experiences within the Church of Scientology (CoS). On several occasions, the licensee of the CoS has initiated copyright infringement lawsuits to restrain the publication of books critical of Scientology or its founder, L. Ron Hubbard. Since 2008, the Internet has been able to provide a much safer ground for publishing material critical of the CoS, because traditional copyright law had little application there.

Books by title 
 Ali's Smile: Naked Scientology (1971) by William S. Burroughs
 Among the Scientologists: History, Theology, and Praxis (2019) by Donald A. Westbrook 
 Bare-faced Messiah: The True Story of L. Ron Hubbard (1987) by Russell Miller
 Believe What You Like: What happened between the Scientologists and the National Association for Mental Health (1973) by C. H. Rolph
 Beyond Belief: My Secret Life Inside Scientology and My Harrowing Escape (2013) by Jenna Miscavige Hill 
 Blown for Good: Behind the Iron Curtain of Scientology (2009) by Marc Headley
 The Church of Scientology: A History of a New Religion (2011) by Hugh Urban
 The Complex: An Insider Exposes the Covert World of the Church of Scientology (2008) by John Duignan (with Nicola Tallant)
 Cults of Unreason (1973) by Christopher Evans
 A Doctor's Report on Dianetics (1951, 1987) by Joseph A. Winter
 Fads and Fallacies in the Name of Science (1952, 1957) by Martin Gardner
 Going Clear: Scientology, Hollywood, and the Prison of Belief (2013) by Lawrence Wright
 Have You Told All? Inside my Time with Narconon and Scientology (2013) by Lucas Catton 
 Hollywood Undercover: Revealing the Sordid Secrets of Tinseltown (2007) by Ian Halperin
 Hollywood, Interrupted: Insanity Chic in Babylon - The Case Against Celebrity (2004) by Andrew Breitbart & Mark Ebner
 Inside Scientology: How I Joined Scientology and Became Superhuman (1972) by Robert Kaufman
 Inside Scientology: The Story of America's Most Secretive Religion (2011) by Janet Reitman
 L. Ron Hubbard, Messiah or Madman? (1987, 1995) by Ronald DeWolf (with Bent Corydon)
 The Mind Benders (1971) by Cyril Vosper
 My Billion Year Contract: Memoir of a Former Scientologist (2009) by Nancy Many ,
 The New Believers (2001) by David V. Barrett
 A Piece of Blue Sky: Scientology, Dianetics, and L. Ron Hubbard Exposed (1990) by Jon Atack
 A Queer and Pleasant Danger: A Memoir (2012) by Kate Bornstein ,
 Religion Inc. The Church of Scientology (1986) by Stewart Lamont ,
 Renunciation and Reformulation: A Study of Conversion in an American Sect (1987) by Harriet Whitehead ,
 The Road to Total Freedom: A Sociological Analysis of Scientology (1976, 1977) by Roy Wallis
 Ruthless: Scientology, My Son David Miscavige, and Me (2016) by Ron Miscavige (with Dan Koon)
 The Scandal of Scientology (1971) by Paulette Cooper
 Scientology: The Now Religion (1970) by George Malko. 
 Tom Cruise: An Unauthorized Biography (2008) by Andrew Morton
 Troublemaker: Surviving Hollywood and Scientology (2015) by Leah Remini

See also 
 Scientology controversies
 List of apologetic works

References 

Scientology-related controversies
 
Bibliographies of subcultures
Criticism of Scientology
Lists of books about religion